John Dudley "Lee" Thompson (February 26, 1898 – February 17, 1963) was a Major League Baseball pitcher who played for the Chicago White Sox in .

External links

1898 births
1963 deaths
Chicago White Sox players
Major League Baseball pitchers
Baseball players from Utah
Occidental Tigers baseball players
People from Smithfield, Utah